Auld Lang Syne is a 1917 British silent crime film directed by Sidney Morgan and starring Violet Graham, Henry Baynton and Sydney Fairbrother. The film is notable for marking the screen debut of Jack Buchanan, who went on to be a leading star. It was produced in a film studio at Ebury Street in Westminster.

Cast
 Violet Graham as Beatrice Potter 
 Henry Baynton as William Daneford 
 Sydney Fairbrother as Mrs. Potter 
 George Bellamy as Luke Potter 
 Roy Travers as Ned Potter 
 Jack Buchanan as Vane

References

Bibliography
 Burton, Alan & Chibnall, Steve. Historical Dictionary of British Cinema. Scarecrow Press, 2013.
 Low, Rachael. The History of the British Film 1914 - 1918. George Allen & Unwin, 1950.

External links
 

1917 films
British crime films
British silent feature films
1910s English-language films
Films directed by Sidney Morgan
1917 crime films
British black-and-white films
1910s British films